This is intended to be a complete list of the properties and districts on the National Register of Historic Places in Pierce County, Washington, United States. Latitude and longitude coordinates are provided for many National Register properties and districts; these locations may be seen together in an online map.

There are 192 properties and districts listed on the National Register in the county. 96 of these properties and districts are located in the city of Tacoma, while the remaining 96 properties and districts are listed separately. Another 2 properties were once listed but have been removed.

Pierce County (exclusive of Tacoma)

|}

Tacoma

|}

Former listings

|}

See also

List of National Historic Landmarks in Washington
National Register of Historic Places listings in Washington state

References

Sources
 Coulombe, Charles A. (2005). Haunted Castles of the World: Ghostly Legends and Phenomena from Keeps and Fortresses Around the Globe, Globe Pequot, .
 Dunkelberger, Steve; Neary, Walter (2005). Lakewood, Arcadia Publishing, .
 Filley, Bette (1996). The Big Fact Book About Mount Rainier, Dunamis House, .
 Galentine, Elizabeth (2006). Anderson Island, Arcadia Publishing, .
 Grau, Robert (1910).  The Business Man in the Amusement World: A Volume of Progress in the Field of the Theatre, Broadway Publishing Co.
 Halliday, Jan; Chehak, Gail (2000). Native Peoples of the Northwest: A Traveler's Guide to Land, Art, and Culture, Sasquatch Books, .
 Holstine, Craig; Hobbs, Richard (2005). Spanning Washington: Historic Highway Bridges of the Evergreen State, Washington State University Press, .
 Kirk, Ruth; Alexander, Carmela (1995). Exploring Washington's Past: A Road Guide to History, University of Washington Press, .
 Price, Lori; Anderson, Ruth (2002). Puyallup: A Pioneer Paradise, Arcadia Publishing, .
 Roberts, George; Roberts, Jan (1999). Discover Historic Washington State, Gem Guides Book Company, .
 Samson, Karl (2006). Frommer's Washington State, Frommer's, .
 Smith, Giselle (2004). Best Places Northwest: The Best Restaurants, Lodgings, and a Complete Guide to the Region, Sasquatch Books, .
 Wootton, Sharon; Savage, Maggie (2007). You Know You're in Washington When...: 101 Quintessential Places, People, Events, Customs, Lingo, and Eats of the Evergreen State, Globe Pequot, .

 

Pierce